Dizzy Up the Girl is the sixth studio album by American rock band the Goo Goo Dolls, released on September 22, 1998 through Warner Bros. Records. The album is often noted for being the album which propelled the Goo Goo Dolls into success, although they already enjoyed some recognition with the downbeat track "Name" in 1995. Dizzy features more upbeat compositions than they had previously recorded. It is also the band's first album to feature drummer Mike Malinin.

History
Dizzy Up the Girl is the Goo Goo Dolls' most successful album to date, selling over 4 million copies (4× platinum certified). The success of Dizzy Up the Girl can largely be attributed to the rock ballad "Iris", which was also included in the soundtrack album of the film City of Angels. "Iris" immediately reached  1 on the Hot 100 Airplay chart upon its release in March from the City of Angels soundtrack, and stayed on top for 18 weeks, setting a record that still stands as of June 2017. The song also reached No. 1 on the Billboard Modern Rock chart, the Adult Top 40 and Mainstream Top 40 chart, along with several other charts in the US and UK, and received three Grammy nominations. The album sold very well, with "Iris" and "Slide" being the two most successful singles, while the other three singles achieved modest success.

In addition to the huge success of "Iris" (US No. 9), Dizzy Up the Girl included three additional top-40 singles, with the songs "Slide" (US #8), "Broadway" (US No. 24), and "Black Balloon" (US No. 16). The album also produced the moderately popular song "Dizzy", which has since become a fan favorite. Along with top-40 single status, music videos for all five singles reached VH1's Top 20 Music Videos chart upon release.

Reception

Stephen Thomas Erlewine of AllMusic stated: "Like a less mannered and conflicted Let Your Dim Light Shine-era Soul Asylum, the trio balances hard rockers with ballads. The difference is, they enjoy the mainstreaming of their music and respond with one of their catchiest sets of songs. There's nothing new on the record apart from their willingness to polish their music so it reaches the widest audience. That will alienate whatever hardcore followers they have left, but that attitude will likely please anyone brought aboard with 'Name' and 'Iris'."

Track listing 

In some countries the album was released with a bonus track, e.g. in Japan ("Iris" - Acoustic version) and in Germany ("Name").

Personnel 
Goo Goo Dolls 
Mike Malinin - drums
Johnny Rzeznik – lead and rhythm guitar, lead vocals, producer
Robby Takac – bass guitar, lead vocals on tracks 4, 7, 9, & 12, producer

Additional personnel
Tommy Keene  - guitar on 'Broadway'
Rob Cavallo – producer
Jack Joseph Puig – mixing
Ken Allardyce – engineer
David Campbell – string arrangements
Greg Collins – assistant engineer
Steve Gerdes – art direction, design
Bob Ludwig – mastering
Jamie Muhoberac – piano, keyboards, processing
Tim Pierce - mandolin and guitar on track 11
Nick Paul – assistant engineer
Melanie Nissen – photography
Carmen Rizzo – programming
Allen Sides – engineer
Darrell Thorp – assistant engineer
Richard Ash - assistant engineer

Charts and certifications

Weekly charts

Year-end charts

Certifications

References

Goo Goo Dolls albums
1998 albums
Warner Records albums
Albums produced by Rob Cavallo